Samsung Galaxy F23 5G  is an Android-based smartphone manufactured by Samsung Electronics. This phone was announced on March 8, 2022. It is part of Samsung Galaxy F series. It is one of the very few Samsung's 5G phones to have a dedicated SDXC slot.

References 

Samsung Galaxy
Android (operating system) devices
Mobile phones introduced in 2022
Mobile phones with multiple rear cameras